The knockout stages of the 2015 Copa do Brasil will be played from August 19 to November 25, 2015. A total of 16 teams will compete in the knockout stages.

The draw for the Round of 16 was held by CBF on 4 August 2015. The 16 qualified teams were divided in two pots. Teams from pot 1 were the six teams directly qualified to the Round of 16, the five teams that competed at the 2015 Copa Libertadores and the best placed team in the 2014 Brazilian Série A not taking part in the 2015 Copa Libertadores, plus the two highest CBF ranked teams qualified via the Third Round. Pot 2 was composed of the other teams that qualified through the Third Round. Each pot was divided into 4 pairs according to the CBF ranking. For the remaining stages of the tournament a new draw was held on 31 August 2015.

Seeding

Bracket

Round of 16

|}

Match 71

Internacional won 4–1 on aggregate and advanced to the Quarterfinals.

Match 72

São Paulo won 4–2 on aggregate and advanced to the Quarterfinals.

Match 73

Palmeiras won 5–3 on aggregate and advanced to the Quarterfinals.

Match 74

Vasco da Gama won 2–1 on aggregate and advanced to the Quarterfinals.

Match 75

Fluminense won 4–2 on aggregate and advanced to the Quarterfinals.

Match 76

Grêmio won 4–1 on aggregate and advanced to the Quarterfinals.

Match 77

Figueirense won 3–2 on aggregate and advanced to the Quarterfinals.

Match 78

Santos won 4–1 on aggregate and advanced to the Quarterfinals.

Quarterfinals

|}

Match 79

São Paulo won 4–1 on aggregate and advanced to the Semifinals.

Match 80

Santos won 4–2 on aggregate and advanced to the Semifinals.

Match 81

Palmeiras won 4–3 on aggregate and advanced to the Semifinals.

Match 82

Tied 1–1 on aggregate, Fluminense won on away goals and advanced to the Semifinals

Semifinals

|}

Match 83

Santos won 6–2 on aggregate and advanced to the Finals.

Match 84

Tied 3–3 on aggregate, Palmeiras won on penalties and advanced to the Finals.

Finals

Tied 2–2 on aggregate, Palmeiras won on penalties.

References

knockout stages